Moo Duk Kwan is the name of a martial art organization founded by Hwang Kee in South Korea in 1945. Licensed Moo Duk Kwan schools teach Soo Bahk Do, formerly Tang Soo Do (and earlier 'Hwa Soo Do'). 'Moo Duk Kwan' translates as "School of Martial Virtue".
Tang Soo Do Moo Duk Kwan translates to “the brotherhood and school of stopping inner and outer conflict and developing virtue according to the way of the worthy hand”

History
As a child, Hwang Kee witnessed a man using Taekyon to defend himself against a large group. The experience later inspired him to develop his own martial art. Although the Korea Taekkyon Associate disputes Hwang's story, Hwang says that the man refused to teach him, leaving him to devise his own system based on what he had seen. Traveling between Manchuria and Korea during World War II, Hwang later successfully appealed to Chinese martial arts teacher Yang Kuk Jin for training, fusing together Chinese and Korean martial arts into a form he initially called Hwa Soo Do ("the Way of the Flowering Hand"), altering to Tang Soo Do after the November 9, 1945 opening of a training hall proved unsuccessful. The new name led to greater success.

Hwang Kee further expanded his Moo Duk Kwan school of martial arts after in 1957 he was introduced to the Muye Dobo Tongji by a librarian at the Korean National University in Seoul. It referenced the martial arts system of Subak, a bare hands and feet technique. Hwang Kee changed the name of his martial art system to "Soo Bahk Do" on June 30, 1960.

 inline, 

After Hwang Kee died on July 14, 2002, his son Hwang Hyun-chul (Jin Mun) was named his successor. His appointment was approved unanimously by the Board of Directors of the United States Soo Bahk Do Moo Duk Kwan Federation, Inc. as well as other chapters through the world.

Trademark and schools
In the United States, "Moo Duk Kwan" and the fist logo are federally registered trademarks of the U.S. Soo Bahk Do Moo Duk Kwan Federation and "Soo Bahk Do" and the "Soo Bahk Do logo" are service marks.

See also 
Soo Bahk Do
Tang Soo Do
Kwan (martial arts)
Taekwondo

Notes

References 

 Sources

 History of Moo Duk Kwan By Hwang Kee 
 A Modern History of Taekwondo 1999 (Korean) Kyong Myung Lee and Kang Won Sik 
 Excerpts from "A Modern History of Taekwondo"
 Global Taekwondo 2003 (English) Kyo Yoon Lee 
 A Guide to Taekwondo 1996 (English) Kyo Yoon Lee 
 Kukkiwon 25th Anniversary Text 1997 (Korean) Un Yong Kim
 Kukkiwon Textbook 2006 (English/Korean) Um Woon Kyu
 Beginning Moo Duk Kwan Tae Kwon Do Korean Art of Self-Defense Volume 1 by Richard Chun.

 Hancock, J. and Plyler, J. (2004). The International Tangsoodo Alliance Official Instructor's Manual, Revised Edition. Guthrie, KY: International Tangsoodo Alliance.

External links 

 Moo Duk Kwan History
 World Moo Duk Kwan

South Korean martial arts